Jürgen Blin (24 April 1943 – 7 May 2022) was a mid-20th century German boxer, who was the Heavyweight Champion of Germany, and European Heavyweight Champion in 1972, and internationally represented the state of West Germany.

Early life
Blin was born on the Baltic Sea island of Fehmarn on 24 April 1943 during World War II, and was a native of the North German city of Hamburg. While living in Hamburg he was a butcher before his boxing career.

Boxing career
Blin's record in the ring was 30–12–6 with eight knockouts. He was greatly admired by German boxing fans for his toughness and stamina in the ring. He was briefly Heavyweight Champion of Germany after defeating Gerhard Zech for the title (he had two draws with him previously).

His first professional bout came against Klaus Krüger in October 1964. Blin won this bout, as well as the next five bouts against domestic opponents, and lost his first professional bout in June 1965 to Ray Patterson in Jordal Amfi.

Blin lost a decision to Joe Bugner in May 1971 when fighting for the European Heavyweight title. Blin later won the title in June 1972, his greatest triumph in the ring, when he beat Jose Urtain (who had beaten Blin for the same title in June 1970). However, in October 1972, Blin once again faced Bugner who regained the title by knocking the German out in the eighth round.

On 26 December 1971, he fought the American boxer Muhammad Ali at Hallenstadion Arena, in Zürich, Switzerland, Blin being knocked out 2 minutes and 12 seconds into the seventh round.

Later years
Blin was co-author with Stephen Brunt of a chapter in a book titled Facing Ali (2002), about his 1971 contest with the United States champion boxer. He died of kidney failure at a hospital in Hamburg on 6 May 2022, aged 79.

Professional boxing record

|-
|align="center" colspan=8|30 Wins (8 knockouts, 22 decisions), 12 Losses (4 knockouts, 8 decisions), 6 Draws 
|-
| align="center" style="border-style: none none solid solid; background: #e3e3e3"|Result
| align="center" style="border-style: none none solid solid; background: #e3e3e3"|Record
| align="center" style="border-style: none none solid solid; background: #e3e3e3"|Opponent
| align="center" style="border-style: none none solid solid; background: #e3e3e3"|Type
| align="center" style="border-style: none none solid solid; background: #e3e3e3"|Round
| align="center" style="border-style: none none solid solid; background: #e3e3e3"|Date
| align="center" style="border-style: none none solid solid; background: #e3e3e3"|Location
| align="center" style="border-style: none none solid solid; background: #e3e3e3"|Notes
|-align=center
|Loss
|
|align=left| Ron Lyle
|TKO
|2
|4 October 1973
|align=left| Denver, Colorado
|align=left|
|-
|Win
|
|align=left| Danny Machado
|TKO
|7
|3 February 1973
|align=left| Kiel, Schleswig-Holstein
|align=left|
|-
|Loss
|
|align=left| Joe Bugner
|KO
|8
|10 October 1972
|align=left| Royal Albert Hall, Kensington, London
|align=left|
|-
|Win
|
|align=left| Jose Manuel Urtain
|PTS
|15
|9 June 1972
|align=left| Madrid
|align=left|
|-
|Win
|
|align=left| Charles E. Chase
|KO
|5
|5 May 1972
|align=left| Hamburg
|align=left|
|-
|Loss
|
|align=left| Muhammad Ali
|KO
|7
|26 December 1971
|align=left| Hallenstadion, Zürich
|align=left|
|-
|Win
|
|align=left| George "Scrap Iron" Johnson
|TKO
|2
|1 October 1971
|align=left| Hamburg
|align=left|
|-
|Loss
|
|align=left| Joe Bugner
|SD
|15
|11 May 1971
|align=left| Empire Pool, Wembley, London
|align=left|
|-
|Win
|
|align=left| Manuel "Pulgarcito" Ramos
|PTS
|10
|2 April 1971
|align=left| Cologne, North Rhine-Westphalia
|align=left|
|-
|Win
|
|align=left| Roberto Davila
|PTS
|10
|26 February 1971
|align=left| Hamburg
|align=left|
|-
|Win
|
|align=left| Vasco Faustino
|PTS
|8
|5 February 1971
|align=left| Frankfurt, Hesse
|align=left|
|-
|Win
|
|align=left| Charley Polite
|PTS
|10
|2 January 1971
|align=left| Wiesbaden, Hesse
|align=left|
|-
|Win
|
|align=left| Sylvester Dullaire
|KO
|8
|17 November 1970
|align=left| Cologne, North Rhine-Westphalia
|align=left|
|-
|Win
|
|align=left| Billy Joiner
|PTS
|10
|9 October 1970
|align=left| Hamburg
|align=left|
|-
|Loss
|
|align=left| Jose Manuel Urtain
|PTS
|15
|22 June 1970
|align=left| Barcelona, Catalonia
|align=left|
|-
|Win
|
|align=left| Ray Patterson

|PTS
|10
|13 February 1970
|align=left| Ernst Merck Halle, Mitte, Berlin
|align=left|
|-
|Win
|
|align=left| Wilhelm Von Homburg
|PTS
|10
|12 December 1969
|align=left| Sporthalle, Cologne, North Rhine-Westphalia
|align=left|
|-
|Win
|
|align=left| Gerhard Zech
|PTS
|10
|21 November 1969
|align=left| Ernst Merck Halle, Hamburg
|align=left|
|-
|Win
|
|align=left| David E. Bailey
|PTS
|10
|12 September 1969
|align=left| Ernst Merck Halle, Hamburg
|align=left|
|-
|Win
|
|align=left| Giulio Rinaldi
|PTS
|10
|29 May 1969
|align=left| Grugahalle, Essen, North Rhine-Westphalia
|align=left|
|-
|Draw
|
|align=left| Macan Keita
|PTS
|8
|29 November 1968
|align=left| Festhalle Frankfurt, Frankfurt, Hesse
|align=left|
|-
|Loss
|
|align=left| Peter Weiland
|PTS
|10
|1 November 1968
|align=left| Ostseehalle, Kiel, Schleswig-Holstein
|align=left|
|-
|Loss
|
|align=left| Piero Tomasoni
|DQ
|2
|29 September 1968
|align=left| Brescia, Lombardy
|align=left|
|-
|Win
|
|align=left| Gerhard Zech
|PTS
|12
|11 May 1968
|align=left| Deutschlandhalle, Charlottenburg, Berlin
|align=left|
|-
|Win
|
|align=left| Lloyd Walford
|PTS
|8
|8 March 1968
|align=left| Sporthalle, Cologne, North Rhine-Westphalia
|align=left|
|-
|Win
|
|align=left| Renato Moraes
|PTS
|10
|17 February 1968
|align=left| Deutschlandhalle, Charlottenburg, Berlin
|align=left|
|-
|Win
|
|align=left| Giuseppe Ros
|PTS
|8
|15 December 1967
|align=left| Sporthalle, Cologne, North Rhine-Westphalia
|align=left|
|-
|Loss
|
|align=left| Piero Del Papa
|PTS
|10
|11 November 1967
|align=left| Deutschlandhalle, Charlottenburg, Berlin
|align=left|
|-
|Draw
|
|align=left| Jose Menno
|PTS
|8
|8 September 1967
|align=left| Sporthalle, Cologne, North Rhine-Westphalia
|align=left|
|-
|Win
|
|align=left| Ivan Prebeg
|KO
|5
|28 April 1967
|align=left| Sporthalle, Cologne, North Rhine-Westphalia
|align=left|
|-
|Draw
|
|align=left| Gerhard Zech
|PTS
|12
|24 February 1967
|align=left| Sporthalle, Cologne, North Rhine-Westphalia
|align=left|
|-
|Draw
|
|align=left| Gerhard Zech
|PTS
|12
|18 November 1966
|align=left| Sporthalle, Cologne, North Rhine-Westphalia
|align=left|
|-
|Loss
|
|align=left| Giulio Saraudi
|PTS
|8
|23 September 1966
|align=left| Palazzetto dello Sport, Rome, Lazio
|align=left|
|-
|Draw
|
|align=left| Giulio Rinaldi
|PTS
|10
|2 September 1966
|align=left| Mungersdorfer Stadion, Cologne, North Rhine-Westphalia
|align=left|
|-
|Win
|
|align=left| Ossi Buettner
|KO
|8
|15 June 1966
|align=left| Festhalle Frankfurt, Frankfurt, Hesse
|align=left|
|-
|Win
|
|align=left| Roland Graetz
|PTS
|6
|14 May 1966
|align=left| Westfalenhallen, Dortmund, North Rhine-Westphalia
|align=left|
|-
|Win
|
|align=left| Andre Wyns
|PTS
|6
|15 April 1966
|align=left| Ernst Merck Halle, Hamburg
|align=left|
|-
|Draw
|
|align=left| Raimo Nisula
|PTS
|8
|18 March 1966
|align=left| Masshallen, Gothenburg
|align=left|
|-
|Loss
|
|align=left| Joseph Juvillier
|PTS
|8
|2 December 1965
|align=left| Westfalenhallen, Dortmund, North Rhine-Westphalia
|align=left|
|-
|Loss
|
|align=left| Wim Snoek
|RTD
|6
|16 October 1965
|align=left| Westfalenhallen, Dortmund, North Rhine-Westphalia
|align=left|
|-
|Win
|
|align=left| Willem Bomber
|PTS
|6
|10 September 1965
|align=left| Ernst Merck Halle, Hamburg
|align=left|
|-
|Loss
|
|align=left| Ray Patterson
|PTS
|6
|21 June 1965
|align=left| Jordal Amfi, Oslo
|align=left|
|-
|Win
|
|align=left| Valere Mahau
|PTS
|4
|9 April 1965
|align=left| Ernst Merck Halle, Hamburg
|align=left|
|-
|Win
|
|align=left| Manfred Schlesinger
|PTS
|6
|27 March 1965
|align=left| Westfalenhallen, Dortmund, North Rhine-Westphalia
|align=left|
|-
|Win
|
|align=left| Danilo Zoratti
|KO
|3
|30 January 1965
|align=left| Stadthalle Bremen, Bremen
|align=left|
|-
|Win
|
|align=left| Friedrich Mayr
|KO
|1
|16 January 1965
|align=left| Westfalenhallen, Dortmund, North Rhine-Westphalia
|align=left|
|-
|Win
|
|align=left| Manfred Ackers
|PTS
|4
|5 December 1964
|align=left| Sporthalle, Cologne, North Rhine-Westphalia
|align=left|
|-
|Win
|
|align=left| Klaus Krueger
|PTS
|4
|16 October 1964
|align=left| Sporthalle, Cologne, North Rhine-Westphalia
|align=left|

References

1943 births
2022 deaths
People from Fehmarn
European Boxing Union champions
German male boxers
Heavyweight boxers
Deaths from kidney disease
Sportspeople from Schleswig-Holstein